Rotterdam The Hague Airport (formerly Rotterdam Airport, Vliegveld Zestienhoven in Dutch),  is a minor international airport serving Rotterdam, the Netherlands' second largest city, and The Hague, its administrative and royal capital.

The airport handled over 2.1 million passengers in 2019 and features scheduled flights to European metropolitan and leisure destinations. It is also used extensively by general aviation and there are several flying clubs, a skydiving club and a flight training school located at the airport.

History

Early years
After World War II, the Dutch government decided that a second national airport was needed in addition to Schiphol. Rotterdam had previously had an airport before the war; Waalhaven airport, but it was heavily damaged in the German bombing of Rotterdam, and was later completely destroyed to prevent it from being used by the Germans. Reconstruction of the airport was not a realistic proposition, so a new location was found in the Zestienhoven polder, giving the airport its original name.

Construction of the airport began in August 1955 and the airport was officially opened in October 1956. Several large international airlines, such as Swissair, Lufthansa, Air France, Channel Airways, and British Air Ferries (Channel Air Bridge) were soon operating to Rotterdam. However, in the 1970s plans were made to either close or move the airport to make space for housing.  Its uncertain future halted the airport's growth and led to many operators leaving.

Development since the 1990s
For almost thirty years the airport faced closure, but the economic growth of the 1990s caused an increase in passengers again, and in 2001 it was decided that the airport's current location would be maintained for at least a century.

The route with the longest continual service, to London Heathrow and operated by KLM Cityhopper, was suspended in 2008. This marked the end of KLM's involvement with the airport. However, in December 2012, British Airways began a service to Rotterdam from Heathrow. In October 2014, British Airways announced they would suspend the route again in March 2015.  British Airways now flies to Rotterdam from London City Airport.

The name of the airport was changed from Zestienhoven to Rotterdam Airport and finally in 2010 to its current name Rotterdam The Hague Airport.

Most flights today are operated by smaller mainline jets such as the Boeing 737 and Airbus A320 series or the Embraer 190. There is also a fair amount of business aviation. State and military aircraft also use the airport frequently, due to its proximity to The Hague, the seat of the Dutch government and various international institutions such as the International Criminal Court. With the closure of nearby Ypenburg Airport in 1992 and Valkenburg Naval Air Base in 2006, Rotterdam The Hague Airport is now the only remaining airport in the area.

The airport experienced significant growth in the 2010s, doubling passenger numbers from 1,000,858 in 2010 to 2,133,976 in 2019.

Airlines and destinations

The following airlines operate regular scheduled and charter flights to and from Rotterdam/The Hague:

Statistics

Passenger numbers

Busiest routes

Ground transportation

Bus
The airport is served by bus line 33, which runs between Rotterdam Centraal, the airport, and further to Meijersplein station. At Meijersplein, transfers are available to metro line E, with frequent service to Den Haag Centraal, Rotterdam Centraal and Rotterdam city center.

Car
The airport is situated next to the busy A13/E19 motorway, which makes it easily accessible via car.

See also
 Transport in the Netherlands
 List of airports in the Netherlands

References

External links

 
 
 

Airports in South Holland
Buildings and structures in Rotterdam
Transport in Rotterdam
Transport in The Hague
Airports established in 1956
1956 establishments in the Netherlands
International airports in the Netherlands
20th-century architecture in the Netherlands